Benahdiq (also Romanized as Benahdīq; also known as Bandarīq) is a village in Misheh Pareh Rural District, in the Central District of Kaleybar County, East Azerbaijan Province, Iran. At the 2006 census, its population was 22, in 5 families.

References 

Populated places in Kaleybar County